The 2nd The Beatz Awards was held at Muson Center in Lagos on December 17, 2016. Nominees were revealed on December 13, 2016. The live show was televised on STV, Nigezie TV, wapTV, TVC and BEN Television, with host Seyi Law, and Lanre Makun.

Performers

Presenters
Seyi Law
Lanre Makun

Nominations and winners
The following is a list of nominees and the winners are listed highlighted in boldface.

References 

2016 music awards
2016 awards